Takatoshi Furukawa (born October 20, 1987) is a Japanese professional basketball player who currently plays for Akita Northern Happinets in the B.League.

He was a member of the Japan national basketball team that competed in the 2015 FIBA Asia Championship. As a member of Team Japan, he is especially known for his outside shooting.

Akita Northern Happinets
Furukawa accepted a three-year contract for Akita Happinets on June 11, 2019. He became the first Happinets player to lead the B.League in free throw percentage in 2021.

Career statistics

Regular season 

|-
| align="left" |  2010-11
| align="left" | Aisin
| 36||   || 17.9|| .381|| .337||  .812|| 1.4|| 0.6|| 0.2|| 0.1|| 5.4
|-
| align="left" |  2011-12
| align="left" | Aisin
| 42|| 42  || 31.5|| .441||  bgcolor="CFECEC"|.446*||  .870|| 2.2|| 1.0|| 0.5|| 0.0|| 11.1
|-
|  align="left"  style="background-color:#afe6ba; border: 1px solid gray" |  2012-13†
| align="left" | Aisin
| 38|| 38  || 29.5|| .375|| .359||  .829|| 1.9|| 0.8|| 0.4|| 0.2|| 8.9
|-
| align="left" |  2013-14
| align="left" | Tochigi
| 51|| 50|| 27.4|| .422|| .353||  bgcolor="CFECEC"|.905*|| 2.3|| 1.1|| 0.4|| 0.0|| 11.4
|-
| align="left" | 2014-15
| align="left" | Tochigi
| 54||54 || 26.7|| .466|| .431|| .846|| 2.1|| 0.9|| 0.4|| 0.1|| 13.1
|-
| align="left" |  2015-16
| align="left" | Tochigi
| 54|| 54|| 28.8|| .452|| .391||  bgcolor="CFECEC"|.893*|| 2.6|| 1.0|| 0.7|| 0.1||  15.7 
|-
| align="left"  style="background-color:#afe6ba; border: 1px solid gray" | 2016-17†
| align="left" | Tochigi
| 48||44 ||22.8 || .411||.374 ||.891 ||1.6 || 0.8|| 0.6|| 0.1|| 11.1
|-
| align="left" | 2017-18
| align="left" | Ryukyu
| 49||27 ||22.5 || .388||.362 ||.835 ||2.3 || 1.5|| 0.4|| 0.1|| 9.6
|-
| align="left" | 2018-19
| align="left" | Ryukyu
| 54||54 ||28.4 || .417||.355 ||.890 ||2.6 || 1.1|| 0.5|| 0.2|| 10.5
|-
| align="left" | 2019-20
| align="left" | Akita
| 30||29 ||25.3 || .325||.301 ||.868 ||2.2 || 1.8|| 0.4|| 0.1|| 8.7
|-
| align="left" | 2020-21
| align="left" | Akita
| 54||46 ||23.8 || .423||.393 ||bgcolor="CFECEC"|.910* ||2.1 || 1.7|| 0.6|| 0.0|| 10.0
|-
|}

Playoffs 

|-
|style="text-align:left;"|2011-12
|style="text-align:left;"|Aisin
| 7 ||   || 31.1 || .305 || .282 || .750 || 2.6 || 1.0|| 0.7|| 0.0 || 7.1
|-
|style="text-align:left;"|2012-13
|style="text-align:left;"|Aisin
| 7 ||   || 32.7 || .397 || .440 || .900 || 2.4 || 1.1|| 0.0|| 0.1 || 10.0
|-
|style="text-align:left;"|2013-14
|style="text-align:left;"|Tochigi
| 3 ||   || 29.0 || .432 || .444 || 1.000 || 2.0 || 1.7|| 1.3|| 0.0 || 15.0
|-
|style="text-align:left;"|2014-15
|style="text-align:left;"|Tochigi
| 4 ||   || 31.0 || .420 || .313 || .895 || 4.3 || 1.0|| 1.0|| 0.3 || 16.0
|-
|style="text-align:left;"|2015-16
|style="text-align:left;"|Tochigi
| 5 ||   || 32.2 || .368 || .359 || .923 || 3.2 || 1.2|| 0.8|| 0.0 || 16.4
|-
|style="text-align:left;"|2016-17
|style="text-align:left;"|Tochigi
| 6 || 6 || 23:52 || .446 || .458 || .778 || 1.8 || 1.2|| 0.33|| 0.0 || 11.3
|-
|style="text-align:left;"|2017-18
|style="text-align:left;"|Ryukyu
| 5 || 5 || 24:43 || .286 || .208 || 1.000 || 2.8 || 0.8|| 0.0 || 0.2 || 9.0
|-
|style="text-align:left;"|2018-19
|style="text-align:left;"|Ryukyu
| 6 || 6 || 25:08 || .348 || .375 || .800 || 2.2 || 0.8|| 0.0 || 0.0 || 7.0
|-

Early cup games 

|-
|style="text-align:left;"|2018
|style="text-align:left;"|Ryukyu
| 2 ||2 || 21:49 || .462 || .143 || 1.000 || 3.5 || 0.0 || 1.0 || 0.0 || 9.0
|-
|style="text-align:left;"|2019
|style="text-align:left;"|Akita
|1 ||1 || 20:05 || .500 || .000 || .750 || 1.0 || 0.0 || 0.0 || 0.0 || 11.0
|-

Preseason games

|-
| align="left" |2019
| align="left" | Akita
| 3 || 3 || 21.0 || .412 ||.500  || .571||1.3 || 1.0|| 0.3 || 0.0 ||  7.3
|-

Source: UtsunomiyaToyamaSendai

Non-FIBA Events Stats

|-
| style="text-align:left;"| 2011
| style="text-align:left;"| Universiade
| 8 ||  ||16.36  || .414 ||.412  || 1.000|| 3.0 ||0.9 || 0.4 || 0.0|| 8.4
|-

FIBA Senior Team Events Stats

|-
| style="text-align:left;"| 2015
| style="text-align:left;"| FIBA Asia Cup
| 9 ||  ||19.54  || .374 ||.288  || .737|| 2.8 || 0.3|| 0.4 || 0.0|| 10.8
|-
| style="text-align:left;"| 2016
| style="text-align:left;"| Olympic Qualifier - Serbia
| 2 ||  ||9.46  || .000 ||.000  || .000|| 2.5 || 0.0|| 0.0 || 0.0|| 0.0
|-
| style="text-align:left;"| 2017
| style="text-align:left;"| FIBA Asia Cup
| 4 ||  ||13.28  || .611 ||.545  || .750|| 0.2 || 0.5|| 0.2 || 0.0|| 7.8
|-
| style="text-align:left;"| 2017
| style="text-align:left;"| Asian World Cup Qualifier
| 7 ||  ||7.31  || .105 ||.077  || 1.000|| 1.3 || 0.1|| 0.0 || 0.0|| 1.1
|-
|}

William Jones Cup

|-
| align="left" |  2012
| align="left" | Japan
|8|| ||21|| .409|| .395|| 1.000|| 1.9||0.9 || 0.6|| 0.0|| 9.9
|-
| align="left" |  2014
| align="left" | Japan
|9|| ||22|| .413|| .419|| .900|| 1.6||0.9 || 0.4|| 0.0|| 8.2
|-
| align="left" |  2015
| align="left" | Japan
|6|| ||26|| .426|| .452|| 1.000|| 3.2||1.2 || 0.7|| 0.0|| 11.0
|-
|- class="sortbottom"
! style="text-align:center;" colspan=2| Career 
! 23 ||  || 23 || .414 || .419 || .962 || 2.1 || 1.0|| 0.6 ||0.0 || 9.5
|-

Terrific 12

|-
| align="left" |  2018
| align="left" | Ryukyu
|4|| ||23.7|| || || || 5.0||1.0 || 0.3|| 0.0|| 8.5
|-

References

External links

1987 births
Living people
Tokai University alumni
Akita Northern Happinets players
Basketball players from Tokyo
Ryukyu Golden Kings players
Sportspeople from Hyōgo Prefecture
Shooting guards
Small forwards
Japanese men's basketball players
Asian Games medalists in basketball
Basketball players at the 2014 Asian Games
Asian Games bronze medalists for Japan
Medalists at the 2014 Asian Games
Utsunomiya Brex players
SeaHorses Mikawa players